The Bellvitge University Hospital (in Catalan Hospital Universitari de Bellvitge), is a public hospital located in town of l'Hospitalet de Llobregat, with an outstanding care, teaching and researching activity. It is specialized in high complexity medical care. It offers all the medical specialties, except for pediatrics and obstetrics. It has been acknowledged five times (years 2004, 2006, 2009, 2010 and 2011) as one of the four best hospitals in Spain in its category by the independent evaluating agency Iasist.

The hospital is served by the Hospital de Bellvitge metro station, on line L1 of the Barcelona Metro, which is located under the hospital car park.

References

Hospitals in Catalonia
Teaching hospitals in Spain